Valerie Gail Raymond is a Canadian diplomat who became the Canadian ambassador to the Czech Republic in 2009.  At the time of her appointment, she was  director general of the Canadian Foreign Service Institute. Raymond was High Commissioner to New Zealand (1997-2001) as well as to Sri Lanka (2002-2005) where she led the High Commission's response to the Indian Ocean tsunami of December 2004.

While Raymond was Ambassador to the Czech Republic, the conservative group REAL Women of Canada reported that she "signed a document on the occasion of a homosexual festival in Prague held in August, 2012, expressing her solidarity with the lesbian, gay, bisexual and transgender communities ("LGBT") alleging their activities were in accordance with rights set out in the UN Declaration of Human Rights."

Education
BA History, University of Guelph, 1974; BJ Honours, Carleton University, 1976  The University of Guelph conferred an honorary doctorate on Valerie Raymond.

References

Year of birth missing (living people)
Living people
High Commissioners of Canada to Sri Lanka
High Commissioners of Canada to New Zealand
Canadian women ambassadors
University of Guelph alumni
Carleton University alumni